Saigon Centre is a mixed-use complex in Ho Chi Minh City, Vietnam, invested by Keppel Land Watco I. The complex is located on Le Loi Boulevard in District 1, Ho Chi Minh City.

History

Phase 1 of the complex was completed in 1996.

In December 2011, construction on phase two started, which comprises a 5-story retail podium and a new 43-story building. The new addition prompted a temporary closure of the existing tower from 2015 to 2016.

On July 30, 2016, Takashimaya opened their first department store in Vietnam at the retail podium of Saigon Centre. It becomes the fourth tallest building in Ho Chi Minh City and the tenth tallest building in Vietnam overall.

Features
Sedona Hotels operates all 284 residential units at the complex.

See also
Saigon Trade Center
Sunwah Tower
List of tallest buildings in Vietnam

References

External links
Official site of Saigon Centre

Skyscrapers in Ho Chi Minh City
Shopping malls in Ho Chi Minh City
Skyscraper office buildings in Vietnam